The episodes of the twelfth season of the Bleach anime series, released on DVD as the . They are directed by Noriyuki Abe, and produced by TV Tokyo, Dentsu and Studio Pierrot. The 17-episode season is based on Tite Kubo's Bleach manga series. The plot continues to show the fight between the Soul Reapers against Sōsuke Aizen's army of arrancars, with the former defending Karakura Town, and the latter planning to use Karakura Town to invade and destroy Soul Society. The season moves on to auto-conclusive stories beginning with episode 227.

The season aired from March 31 to July 21, 2009 on TV Tokyo. The English adaptation of the Bleach anime is licensed by Viz Media, and aired on Cartoon Network's Adult Swim from July 17 to November 6, 2011. A total of four DVD volumes, each containing four episodes, have been released by Aniplex from January 27 to April 21, 2010.

The episodes use four pieces of theme music: two opening themes and two closing themes. The first two episodes use "Velonica" by Aqua Timez as the opening theme. The second opening theme,  by Scandal is used for the remainder of the season. The first ending theme,  by Shion Tsuji is used for the first two episodes.


Episode list

References
General

Specific

2009 Japanese television seasons
Season 12